Urbalacone is a commune in the French department of Corse-du-Sud on the island of Corsica.

Population

See also
Communes of the Corse-du-Sud department

References

Communes of Corse-du-Sud